Anti-Chinese sentiment has been present in Japan since at least the Tokugawa period.

History

Tokugawa period

Beginning in the  period (1600 to 1868), Japan left a prolonged period of civil war and began to prosper as a unified and stable state. This period saw an attempt to remove foreign influences on Japanese culture, including the influence of Chinese culture. During this time, Japan maintained a policy of self-isolation, leading to the further development of its culture with little foreign influence. A rise in national self-respect at this time resulted in Japan viewing itself as the centre of a "civilised world surrounded by barbarians."

Practitioners of  placed particular importance on Shinto, Japan's indigenous religion, seen as a bulwark against foreign, and especially Confucian and Buddhist, influences. However, by the time  developed, Shinto had already been heavily influenced by both Confucianism and Buddhism; due to this, the net effect of  scholarship and its achievements is debated.

Empire of Japan

Following the Meiji Restoration and the abandonment of its self isolationist policy, Japan pursued a policy of aggressive Westernisation and industrialisation in effort to match the progress of Western nations. At the same time as this, China had begun to sink into a state of deep dysfunction, and was perceived as a declining power by many, including Japan, which increasingly lost respect for China. Increasingly Sinophobic sentiment within Japan contributed to a number of atrocities committed by Imperial Japanese soldiers against the Chinese during World War II, most notably the Nanking Massacre.

The Second Sino-Japanese War (1937-1945) also compounded on this, resulting in the loss of life of more than 20 million mostly civilian Chinese people. The property loss suffered by the Chinese was valued at US$383 billion at the currency exchange rate in July 1937, roughly 50 times the GDP of Japan at that time (US$7.7 billion).

Post World War II

Following the end of the World War II, openly Sinophobic sentiments were stifled and became taboo in mainstream Japanese media, despite the opposing positions taken by Japan and the People's Republic of China in the Cold War. Use of the formerly common word  (lit., "China") has all but disappeared except in a handful of cases, such as the Japanese name for "South China Sea" and an alternative term for ramen.

Following the Cold War, there was little contact between Japan and the People's Republic of China, and little discussion of China until the relationship between the countries was normalised in 1972, following a surge of interest within Japan about its neighbour. China renounced reparations for the Second World War, partly to avoid appearing less generous than Taiwan — which had earlier done the same — and to strengthen its position against the Soviet Union. The response was of considerable gratitude and goodwill in Japan, with Sinophobia confined to anti-communism. Public animosity toward the People's Republic of China was minimal compared to the public animosity held against the Soviet Union, and a friendly mood prevailed. Improvements were also seen in social attitudes toward ethnic Chinese residents of Japan, along with other minorities such as Zainichi Koreans and the Ainu people.

However, since 2000, Japan has seen a gradual resurgence of anti-Chinese sentiments, coupled with the effects of an increasingly tense political relationship between Japan and the People's Republic of China. The reason partly stems from the Japanese history textbook controversies and official visits to the Yasukuni Shrine, as well as Chinese use of anti-Japan sentiment to buttress their own domestic politics. The anti-Japanese riots in the spring of 2005 are cited as raising tensions within China and fears within the Japanese public of China.

The Economist has written that according to a survey done in 2021, more than 40% of Japanese aged 18-29 feel an "affinity" towards China, compared to only 13% for those aged in their 60s and 70s.

See also
China–Japan relations
History of China–Japan relations
Anti-Chinese sentiment in Korea
Anti-Chinese sentiment in the United States
Anti-Korean sentiment in Japan
Anti-Japanese sentiment in China
Nativism (politics)

References

 
China–Japan relations
Japan
Racism in Japan